The 1928 United States presidential election in Nebraska was held on November 6, 1928 as part of the 1928 United States presidential election. State voters chose eight electors to the Electoral College, who voted for president and vice president. 

Nebraska was won by the Republican candidate Herbert Hoover, who won the state by 147,786 votes or 27.01 percentage points against Al Smith.

Results

Results by county

See also
 United States presidential elections in Nebraska

Notes

References

Nebraska
1928 Nebraska elections
United States presidential elections in Nebraska